Duane J. Roth (November 24, 1949 – August 3, 2013) was chief executive officer and member of the board of CONNECT. He graduated from Iowa Wesleyan College.

Career
Before working with CONNECT, Roth founded Alliance Pharmaceutical Corp, where he served as chief executive officer and chairman of the board.  Before a founder of Alliance Pharmaceutical, Roth held management positions at Wyeth and Johnson & Johnson.

Service on advisory committees and boards
Roth has served as a member of the board of directors of the Biotechnology Industry Organization, BIOCOM, the California Healthcare Institute, and SAIC-Frederick, Inc.  Roth served on boards of the University of California, including the President’s Board on Science and Innovation, the California Institute for Telecommunications and Information Technology, the UCSD Sulpizio Cardiovascular Center, the UCSD Foundation board of directors, the UCSD Health Sciences advisory board, and the Industry Dean’s Advisory Board of the Skaggs School of Pharmacy and Pharmaceutical Sciences.  Roth is chairman of the Founders Circle of the UC San Diego Preuss Charter School.  He also served on the board of SDSU College of Business as well as the advisory boards of SDSU Sciences & Engineering.

Governmental appointments and participation
In 2006 Roth was appointed to the Independent Citizens Oversight Committee for the California Institute of Regenerative Medicine by Governor Arnold Schwarzenegger, and was elected vice chairman in 2009.  Roth was also a member on the Governor's Commission for Jobs and Economic Growth, and was co-chair of the Affordable Housing Working Group.

Awards
Roth has received awards including:

 The Economic Opportunity Award from Lead San Diego.
 The Lifetime Achievement Award from the San Diego Business Journal.
The Distinguished Alumni Award from Iowa Wesleyan University.

Death
Roth died on August 3, 2013, in UC San Diego Medical Center of complications of injuries in a bicycle accident on July 21, 2013, during a charity ride for the Challenged Athletes Foundation. The CIRM's obituary for Roth notes his efforts both on the CIRM board and for patient advocacy via the Independent Citizens Oversight Committee (ICOC).

Notes

1949 births
2013 deaths
Iowa Wesleyan University alumni
American pharmacologists
Road incident deaths in California
Cycling road incident deaths